Phobetica is a genus of moth in the family Gelechiidae. It contains the single species Phobetica ignobilis, which is found in Australia, where it has been recorded from Tasmania.

References

Gnorimoschemini